STII may refer to:

 Straits Times Industrial Index (STII), a former Singapore stock index, replaced by the Straits Times Index
 Science and Technology Information Institute (STII), a Philippine government institute, part of the government Department of Science and Technology

See also

 ST2 (disambiguation)
 ST11 (disambiguation)
 Stil (disambiguation)